New York State Route 3B may refer to:

New York State Route 3B (1930–1932) in Orleans and Monroe Counties
New York State Route 3B (1932–1935) in Niagara and Orleans Counties